The 1844 Missouri gubernatorial election was held on August 5, 1844, Missouri Secretary of State John Cummins Edwards, the Democratic nominee, defeated Whig candidate Charles H. Allen.

Results

References

Missouri
1844
Gubernatorial
August 1844 events